10.5 may refer to:

10.5 (miniseries), a television miniseries that aired on NBC in 2004
10.5: Apocalypse, the sequel to the 10.5 television miniseries
Mac OS X Leopard, the sixth major release of Mac OS X, Apple's operating system for Macintosh computers